Alexander Amponsah (born 12 September 1997) is a Ghanaian footballer who plays as a defensive midfielder.

Career
Amponsah was playing in the lower divisions of Ghana's football pyramid for Sports Council FC and King Solomon FC. He later joined CRF Cyprus in 2013. He then was transferred to FC Uijeongbu in 2015 and Ultimate F.C. Ghana in 2017.

On 24 November 2020, Alexander Amponsah signed a two-year contract with Myanmar National League side Rakhine United.

On 7 February 2021, Amponsah officially signed a two-year contract with Malaysia Premier League club PDMR. He was assigned the number 8 jersey.

References

1997 births
Living people
Footballers from Accra
Ghanaian footballers
Ghanaian expatriate footballers
Expatriate footballers in Myanmar
PDRM FA players
Ghanaian expatriate sportspeople in Malaysia
Expatriate footballers in Malaysia
Myanmar National League players